Istgah-e Mazu (also Romanized as Īstgāh-e Māzū; also known as Mazu and Māzū) is a village in Mazu Rural District, Alvar-e Garmsiri District, Andimeshk County, Khuzestan Province, Iran. At the 2006 census, its population was 139, in 33 families.

References 

Populated places in Andimeshk County